Pascal Richter (born 10 October 1996) is a German footballer who plays as a midfielder for VfB Oldenburg.

References

External links
 
 

Living people
1996 births
German footballers
Association football midfielders
3. Liga players
Regionalliga players
VfL Osnabrück players
VfB Oldenburg players